Svydovets protected massif is a protected area in the Ukrainian Carpathians near Rakhiv in the Zakarpattya region.

References

Landforms of Ukraine
Protected areas of Ukraine